Elections to Omagh District Council were held on 17 May 1989 on the same day as the other Northern Irish local government elections. The election used three district electoral areas to elect a total of 21 councillors.

Election results

Note: "Votes" are the first preference votes.

Districts summary

|- class="unsortable" align="centre"
!rowspan=2 align="left"|Ward
! % 
!Cllrs
! % 
!Cllrs
! %
!Cllrs
! %
!Cllrs
! % 
!Cllrs
!rowspan=2|TotalCllrs
|- class="unsortable" align="center"
!colspan=2 bgcolor="" | SDLP
!colspan=2 bgcolor="" | Sinn Féin
!colspan=2 bgcolor="" | UUP
!colspan=2 bgcolor="" | DUP
!colspan=2 bgcolor="white"| Others
|-
|align="left"|Mid Tyrone
|17.4
|1
|bgcolor="#008800"|34.8
|bgcolor="#008800"|3
|20.7
|2
|10.5
|0
|16.6
|1
|7
|-
|align="left"|Omagh Town
|bgcolor="#99FF66"|36.6
|bgcolor="#99FF66"|3
|13.8
|1
|15.5
|1
|21.7
|2
|12.4
|1
|7
|-
|align="left"|West Tyrone
|26.6
|2
|23.9
|2
|bgcolor="40BFF5"|28.2
|bgcolor="40BFF5"|2
|14.3
|1
|7.0
|0
|7
|-
|- class="unsortable" class="sortbottom" style="background:#C9C9C9"
|align="left"| Total
|26.1
|6
|24.9
|6
|21.9
|5
|15.1
|3
|12.0
|1
|21
|-
|}

District results

Mid Tyrone

1985: 3 x Sinn Féin, 1 x UUP, 1 x SDLP, 1 x DUP, 1 x IIP
1989: 3 x Sinn Féin, 2 x UUP, 1 x SDLP, 1 x Independent Nationalist
1985-1989 Change: UUP gain from DUP, Independent Nationalist leaves IIP

Omagh Town

1985: 2 x SDLP, 2 x DUP, 1 x UUP, 1 x Sinn Féin, 1 x Independent Labour
1989: 3 x SDLP, 2 x DUP, 1 x UUP, 1 x Sinn Féin
1985-1989 Change: Independent Labour joins SDLP

West Tyrone

1985: 2 x UUP, 2 x SDLP, 2 x Sinn Féin, 1 x DUP
1989: 2 x UUP, 2 x SDLP, 2 x Sinn Féin, 1 x DUP
1985-1989 Change: No change

References

Omagh District Council elections
Omagh